Miracles of the Heart is the first solo studio album by James D-Train Williams known also as part of the American urban/post-disco group D Train. The record was released in 1986 by Columbia Records in the US and via CBS Records in the United Kingdom.

The single "Misunderstanding" was a number ten R&B hit in the Billboard charts, while the romantic slow jam "Oh, How I Love You, Girl" made it to number 22 on Billboard's R&B singles chart. The album itself got as far as number 51 on Billboard's R&B albums chart.

Miracles of the Heart was remastered and expanded by Funky Town Grooves in 2011, which included six bonus tracks.

Track listing

(*) Bonus tracks on the remastered version

References

External links
Miracles of the Heart at Discogs

1986 albums
D Train (entertainer) albums
Columbia Records albums